This is a list of superzoom bridge cameras with zoom ratios equivalent to or larger than 40x.

See also
Point-and-shoot camera
Digital single-lens reflex camera
Camera phone

References